Henderson Bryant Douglas (December 25, 1888 – August 24, 1971) was an American politician in the state of Florida. He served in the Florida State Senate from 1953 to 1955 as a Democratic member for the 3rd district.

References

1888 births
1971 deaths
People from Brewton, Alabama
People from Bonifay, Florida
Democratic Party Florida state senators
Pork Chop Gang
20th-century American politicians